Pablo Salvador is a Chilean gay activist and blogger born in Panama as Salvador Sepúlveda Montoya. Salvador is Master in Direction of Communication of Pompeu Fabra University, Barcelona, Spain and Professor of History and Management.  The greatest success of Chile in a gay contest was in February 2011 when Salvador, Mr. Gay Chile 2009 - 2010, won the International Mr Gay Competition.

The Activist
As an activist, Salvador volunteered in various LGBTI organizations of Chile. Salvador was Spokesman of Education Commission of Fundación Iguales, the Coach and Spokesman for the Organization Mister Gay Chile The New Age, and Spokesman of Daniel Zamudio Foundation. Currently,  Salvador is an independent LGBTI activist cause.

The Titleholder
At the second edition of Mister Gay Chile competition, Salvador  returns to compete for the title and won, in December 2009. In February 2010,  Salvador represents Chile in the second edition of the Mr Gay World completion in Oslo, Norway  The performance of Salvador was praised by the press and by the judges, especially in the personal interview by Editor in Chief of DNA magazine Returning to Chile, Salvador  dedicated his period as Mister Gay Chile to support social causes as the fight against bullying and homophobia, with  appearances in the press and gay community activities. In January 2011, Salvador competed in the Mr. Gay International and won the title. As International Mr. Gay, Pablo Salvador works for the LGBTQ+ community supporting the first Chilean campaign against bullying at schools. The Educating in Diversity campaign was realized by Movilh and the Teachers Unnion (Colegio de Profesores). Pablo appeared on Radio and Television Stations in Chile as activist and spokesman.

Director of Mr. Gay 

Former Mister Gay Chile, Salvador  who became a Mister Gay World contestant and the winner of the last edition of Mr. Gay International competition  in 2011, is the official national franchise holder of the Mister Gay World Organization in Chile since 2016. Salvador is the National Director after it was passed on by its predecessor, Mister Gay Chile, La Nueva Era, which had been the franchise holder from 2012 to 2013. Salvador live in Madrid, Spain and is the Regional Director of Mister Gay World for South America since 2018.

References

External links
 Salvador's Texts on: http://www.elquintopoder.cl/ciudadania/matrimonio-igualitario-real-interes-o-estrategia/, http://www.elquintopoder.cl/genero/francis-francoise-el-arte-de-traspasar-el-genero/, http://www.elquintopoder.cl/ciudadania/orgullo-gay-algo-con-lo-que-no-hay-que-incomodarse-2/, http://www.sepiensa.net/edicion/index.php?option=content&task=view&id=448&Itemid=40.
 Mr Gay World 2010 Delegates: http://www.mrgayworld.com/delegates-2010/ .
 Salvador won International Mr. Gay 2011: http://www.lun.com/lunmobile//Pages/NewsDetailMobile.aspx?dt=2011-02-04&PaginaId=11&SupplementId=0&bodyid=0. 
Salvador's Blogs: http://www.FactorBanda.blogspot.com (magazine about fashion, marketing and beauty) http://GMANfull.blogspot.com (gay topics).

Chilean gay men
Male beauty pageant winners
Chilean male models
Living people
People from Santiago
Chilean LGBT rights activists
Year of birth missing (living people)